Neolithocolletis is a genus of moths in the family Gracillariidae.

Species
Neolithocolletis hikomonticola Kumata, 1963
Neolithocolletis kangarensis Kumata, 1993
Neolithocolletis mayumbe De Prins, 2012
Neolithocolletis nsengai De Prins, 2012
Neolithocolletis pentadesma (Meyrick, 1919)

External links
Global Taxonomic Database of Gracillariidae (Lepidoptera)

Lithocolletinae
Gracillarioidea genera

Taxa named by Tosio Kumata